Gunnaur is a town and a nagar panchayat in Sambhal district in the Indian state of Uttar Pradesh. It has an average elevation of 170 metres (557 feet).

Demographics
As of the 2001 Census of India, Gunnaur is basically a village constituency of 4.38 lakh people. Males constitute 52% of the population and females 48%. Gunnaur has an average literacy rate of 31%, lower than the national average of 59.5%: male literacy is 38%, and female literacy is 24%. In Gunnaur, 19% of the population is under 6 years of age.

See also
Abr Ahasani Gunnauri

References

Cities and towns in Sambhal district